The A1 motorway is a motorway in Bosnia and Herzegovina that is part of the European route E73 and, together with Croatian motorways A10 and A5, and the Hungarian M6, will provide a modern and fast road connection from Budapest to Ploče, a seaport on the Adriatic Sea.
The motorway will connect the capital Sarajevo with other large cities, such as Mostar and Zenica. It will also be the main link to Bosnia and Herzegovina from the Adriatic Sea and Central Europe.

Sections 
 Section 1: Sava - Doboj
64 km
 Section 2: Doboj - Sarajevo south (Tarčin)
150 km
 Section 3: Sarajevo south (Tarčin) - Mostar (north)
58 km
 Section 4: Mostar (north) - Croatian border
68 km
Total: 340 km

On 20 June 2013, the 5 km section between Bijača and Kravica was opened. A new border crossing with Croatia opened on June 28.

The motorway passes near the following cities:

Significance 
The A1 motorway is the most important road project in Bosnia and Herzegovina. Its construction is expected to enhance economic and social activities, and will connect Bosnia and Herzegovina with the major European traffic network.

Exit list
{| class="wikitable"
|- 
!scope="col"|km
!scope="col"|Exit
!scope="col"|Name
!scope="col"|Destination
!scope="col"|Notes
|-
| 0.0
|
| Svilaj border crossing
| 
| Svilaj border crossing to Croatia. The road continues into Croatia as the A5 motorway towards Osijek.The northern terminus of the motorway
|-
| 0.0
| 1
| Svilaj
| 
| Connection to Brod (to the west)
|-
| 9.5
| 2
| Odžak
| 
| Connection to Odžak
|-
| colspan ="5" bgcolor=#C0C0C0 |  Odžak - Modriča Modriča - Zenica
|-
| 114.2
| align=center | 12
| Zenica North
| 
| Connection to Zenica
|-
| 130.3
| align=center | 13
| Zenica South
| 
| Connection to Zenica
|- 
| 136.2
| align=center | 14
| Lašva
| 
| Connection to Travnik and Vitez (to the west)
|-
| 144.6
| align=center | 15
| Kakanj
| 
| Connection to Kakanj
|-
| bgcolor=#fcdcdc | 146.7
| bgcolor=#fcdcdc | 
| bgcolor=#fcdcdc | Kameni Dvorac rest area
| bgcolor=#fcdcdc |
| bgcolor=#fcdcdc | Accessible to northbound traffic only
|-
| bgcolor=#fcdcdc | 147.9
| bgcolor=#fcdcdc |
| bgcolor=#fcdcdc | TE Kakanj
| bgcolor=#fcdcdc | 
| bgcolor=#fcdcdc | Connection to Kakanj Power Station (accessible to southbound traffic only)
|-
| 161.4
| align=center | 16
| Visoko
| 
| Connection to Visoko and Kiseljak
|-
| bgcolor=#fcdcdc | 163.5
| bgcolor=#fcdcdc | 
| bgcolor=#fcdcdc | Visoko rest area
| bgcolor=#fcdcdc |
| bgcolor=#fcdcdc | Accessible to southbound traffic only
|-
| 168.6
| align=center | 17
| Podlugovi
| 
| Connection to Ilijaš
|-
| 179.7
| 
| Sarajevo North toll plaza
|-
| 180.3
| align=center | 18
| Sarajevo North
| 
| Connection to Vogošća
|-
| 185.1
| align=center | 19
| Butila
| 
| Connection to Sarajevo via BC1 expressway
|-
| 189.1
| align=center | 20
| Sarajevo West
| 
| Connection to Hadžići (to the south)
|-
| 193
| 
| Sarajevo West toll plaza
|-
| 198.5
| align=center |21
| Lepenica
| 
| Connection to Kiseljak (to the north)
|-
| 201.2
| align=center |
| colspan=3 | Lepenica rest area
|-
| 208
| align=center |22
| Tarčin
| 
| 
|-
| colspan ="5" bgcolor=#C0C0C0 |  Tarčin - Čapljina Čapljina - Međugorje
|-
| 328.8
| align=center |32
| Međugorje
| 
| Connection to Međugorje (to the north)
|-
| 334.9
| align=center |
| colspan=3 |Kravica rest area
|-
| 336.5
| 
| Zvirići toll plaza
|-
| 337.5
| align=center |33
| Zvirići
| 
| Connection to Ljubuški (to the north)
|-
| 340
| align=center |
| Bijača border crossing
| 
| Bijača border crossing to Croatia. The road continues into Croatia as the A10 motorwayThe southern terminus of the motorway.

Environmental concerns  and criticism

Since the beginning proposed route for the A1 highway on corridor Vc was under heavy criticism from environmentalists, groups and concerned citizens, as well as some factions in academic community and media, for its encroachment on many already highly endangered natural phenomena, habitats and to significant extent on specific way of human life in traditional communities in relationship with characteristic Dinaric karst milieu and its characteristic biotope, hydrogeology and topography.

This is especially emphasized in region of Herzegovina where most of Bosnia and Herzegovina's karstic topography and biodiversity is distributed. Several particular sections are of most concern: section in vicinity of Počitelj, section passing through Blagaj, and section through massif of Prenj.

For that reason another variant of the route is proposed for every of three particular problematic sections.

References

Highways in Bosnia and Herzegovina